Spreadsheet is an Australian television comedy-drama series streaming on Paramount+. The eight-part series was created and written by Kala Ellis. It is distributed internationally by ITV Studios, and will broadcast in the UK on Channel 4.

The show was developed in-house at Northern Pictures by Kala Ellis and Darren Ashton, who were joined in the writers room by writer Romina Accurso and comedian Rhys Nicholson.

Premise
Lauren is a divorced mother-of-two and working lawyer who enjoys casual sex with many men. With the help of best friend Alex, she develops a spreadsheet to track and manage her sex life, but ends up with even more complications.

Cast
 Katherine Parkinson as Lauren
 Rowan Witt as Alex
 Stephen Curry as Matt
 Katrina Milosevic as Ange
 Robbie J. Magasiva as Jake
 Ryan Shelton as Simon
 Zahra Newman as Helena
 Kerry Armstrong as Carol
 Richard Piper as Roger
 Christie Whelan Browne as Nancy
 Bernard Curry as Nathan

Episodes

References

External links
 

2020s Australian comedy television series
2020s Australian drama television series
2020s comedy-drama television series
2020s sitcoms
2020s workplace comedy television series
2020s workplace drama television series
2021 Australian television series debuts
2021 Australian television series endings
Casual sex in television
English-language television shows
Paramount+ original programming
Television series about dysfunctional families
Television series by ITV Studios